"Snitch" is a song by American rapper Obie Trice, released as the second single from his second studio album Second Round's on Me (2006). The song features guest vocals from American singer Akon, who also produced the song and helped to write it along with Trice.

Critical reception
"Snitch" received generally positive reviews from music critics. Henry Adaso of About.com called "Snitch" a "potent single" and complimented the musical growth shown by Trice on the song, noted that it "signal[s] Trice's transition from the cartoonish Slim Shady accomplice that once underwhelmed... to a sole survivor." However, in his review for Stylus Magazine, Jonathan Bradley called "Snitch" "an enjoyable but inessential track": he also felt it to be unoriginal, writing that it "sounds like every other Akon guest appearance on the market" and that Trice was "poorly served by hooking up with the hot guests of the moment".

Track listing
Vinyl, 12", 33 ⅓ RPM

CD

Charts

Radio and release history

References

2006 singles
2006 songs
Obie Trice songs
Akon songs
Song recordings produced by Akon
Songs written by Akon
Music videos directed by Jessy Terrero
Gangsta rap songs